Hypobapta diffundens, the diffundens grey, is a moth of the family Geometridae first described by Thomas Pennington Lucas in 1891. It is found in the Australian state of Queensland.

The wingspan is about 20 mm.

The larvae feed on Eucalyptus species.

References

Moths described in 1891
Pseudoterpnini
Moths of Australia